The airfield and helipad Torraccia is located in the Republic of San Marino, 200 meters from the border with Italy. It is the only airport in the Republic and is managed by the Aeroclub San Marino.

Technical description 
The airfield, in the grass, is 625 meters long, with 16/34 orientation. The preferred orientation is runway 16 for takeoffs and  runway 34 for landings. Runway 34 has a circuit with turns to the right.

 In 1983 it constitutes the Aeroclub San Marino that legal recognition as an association by the Council of Twelve in 1985; in the same year was built the airfield of Torraccia.

The municipal plan has approved an expansion of the runway length to a total of 950 meters. The expansion, however, is hindered by the residents, because of a recent regulation that allowed the construction of residential buildings almost on the runway.

The helipad, of small size (98.2 meters), allows the landing of various types of helicopters.

The Frecce Tricolori, aerobatic aircraft of various types, and the paratroopers have sometimes performed at the airfield.

Both runways are open everyday including holidays.

On June 19, 2011, the helipad was used by Pope Benedict XVI to visit the Diocese of San Marino-Montefeltro. After reaching the airfield from the heliport of the Vatican City, the Pope from here went to Pennabilli.

On Christmas Eve of 2014, the president of Aeroclub San Marino Corrado Carattoni launched the idea of adapting the airfield and helipad to an airport in the national interest by paving the runway, increasing hangar spaces and a lengthening the runway by 650 m.

Incidents 
On June 11, 2010, a Cessna 172 from Aeroclub Fano did not stop at the end of runway 34 due to a failure in the braking system, and a gust of wind from the south-west. Injured were two occupants on board the aircraft, which was completely destroyed. The incident investigation was conducted by the Agenzia Nazionale per la Sicurezza del Volo, the agency that deals with accidents or serious incidents that take place on Italian soil, that signed a memorandum of understanding with the civil aviation authority of San Marino in 2009.
On May 22, 2017, a Cessna 172 (F-HAPT) of French Aéroclub Paul Tissandier flipped over on the runway during the landing. The two occupants on board the aircraft were only slightly injured, but the aircraft was severely damaged. The incident investigation is being conducted by the Agenzia Nazionale per la Sicurezza del Volo.

See also 
 Torraccia

Notes

External links 
 
 
 

Airports in Europe
Transport in San Marino
Domagnano